The Cony Guppy is a small pickup truck manufactured by Aichi. The vehicle had suicide doors and rotating amber beacons on the B-pillar. The brake lights were tiny and circular. The engine, which rests behind the seats, is a two-valve, 199 cc single-cylinder unit that produces . Aichi rated the Guppy's fuel economy at 50 km/L. They also claimed the Guppy could carry  of cargo. Its low price of ¥225,000 made it attractive to small business owners and cargo transporters. Other features include a four-wheel independent suspension and a torque converter for clutchless driving.

Nissan donated 100 cars based on the Guppy to the Kodomo no Kuni Children's Park in Hazu, Aichi, in 1965. This was long after the Guppy had been taken out of production; Nissan built them from leftover parts acquired as a result of their gradual takeover of the Aichi company. Otherwise they were mechanically identical to the Guppy, but with different bodywork.

Criticism 

Author Tony Davis criticized the Guppy for being an unreliable car that failed to sell in its home country in the Motoring Hall of Shame in the book Extra Lemon!.

References 

Cars introduced in 1961
Cars of Japan
Rear mid-engine, rear-wheel-drive vehicles